In the canon law of the Catholic Church,  ecclesiastical privileges are the privileges enjoyed by the clergy. Their scope varied over time.

The main privileges are:
Privilegium canonis, regarding personal inviolability against malicious injury
Privilegium fori, regarding a special tribunal in civil and criminal causes before an ecclesiastical judge. 
Privilegium immunitatis, exemption from taxation and some other burdens
Privilegium competentiae, right to proper sustenance

In addition to personal privileges, ecclesiastical privileges may cover consecrated and sacred places and things.

References

Canon law of the Catholic Church